The 1995 Men's Ice Hockey World Championships was the 59th such event sanctioned by the International Ice Hockey Federation (IIHF). Teams representing 39 countries participated in several levels of competition. The competition also served as qualifications for group placements in the 1996 competition.

The top Championship Group tournament took place in Sweden from 23 April to 7 May 1995, with games played in Stockholm and Gävle. In the tournament final, Finland won the gold medal by defeating Sweden 4–1 at the Globen arena in Stockholm. The Finnish goals were scored by Timo Jutila and Ville Peltonen, who scored a hat trick. The gold medal was the first in Finland's history. Sweden had written a fight song, "Den glider in", which also was intended to be the official song of the championships. After the finals, the song became very popular in Finland. The final still has an important place in Finnish hockey culture today, a common exclamation being "95: Never forget!"

Because of the 1994–95 NHL lockout, it originally created a dream scenario for the tournament hosts. With a cancelled NHL season, all NHL players free from injuries would have been available. But when the NHL season began in late January 1995, it instead created a scenario where fewer NHL players than usual became available. The Canadian and American teams would logically be hit the hardest, but the Americans found a way to lead their group in the first round. The Canadians, who struggled in the early tournament, beat the Americans in the quarter-finals, lasted until overtime against Sweden in the semifinal, and then beat the Czechs for the bronze. Andrew McKim, playing in the minors for the Adirondack Red Wings, ended up being the tournament scoring leader.

World Championship Group A (Sweden)

Locations

First round

Group 1

Group 2

Consolation round 11–12 place 

Switzerland was relegated to Group B.

Playoff round

Quarterfinals

Semifinals

Match for third place

Final 
Time is local (UTC+2).

World Championship Group B (Slovakia) 
Played in Bratislava, 12–21 April. The hosts bettered their Group C record of the previous year, this time winning all their games. Thirty-eight-year-old Peter Stastny led the tournament in scoring.

Slovakia was promoted to Group A while Romania was relegated to Group C.

World Championship Group C1 (Bulgaria) 
Played in Sofia 20–26 March. Nine teams took part this year because Yugoslavia was given the right to return to the group that they had last played in as the Socialist Federal Republic of Yugoslavia. The consequence was that two teams were relegated. They played in three groups of three where the first place teams contested promotion and the third place teams contested relegation. Two years after failing to qualify for Group C, Belarus got a rematch against Ukraine and Kazakhstan, this time coming out on top.

First round

Group 1

Group 2

Group 3

Final round 21–23 place 

Belarus was promoted to Group B.

Consolation round 24–26 place

Consolation round 27–29 place 

Both Yugoslavia and Bulgaria were relegated to group C2.

World Championship Group C2 (South Africa) 
Played in Johannesburg and Krugersdorp in South Africa from 21 to 30 March. Two groups of five played round robins where the top two from each contested promotion. The bottom five teams were relegated to qualification tournaments for 1996 Group D. Belgian player Joris Peusens was only fifteen years old.

First round

Group 1 

Greece was relegated to Group D qualification.

Group 2 

New Zealand was relegated to Group D qualification.

Final round 30–33 place 

Croatia only needed to tie Lithuania in their final game to earn promotion to Group C1, and they did so.

Consolation round 34–37 place 

Israel, Australia, and South Africa, all were relegated to Group D qualification.

Consolation round 38–39 place

Ranking and statistics

Tournament Awards 
Best players selected by the directorate:
Best Goaltender:  Jarmo Myllys
Best Defenceman:  Christer Olsson
Best Forward:  Saku Koivu
Media All-Star Team:
Goaltender:  Roman Turek
Defence:  Timo Jutila,  Tommy Sjodin
Forwards:  Saku Koivu,  Jere Lehtinen,  Ville Peltonen

Final standings 
The final standings of the tournament according to IIHF:

Scoring leaders 
List shows the top skaters sorted by points, then goals.
Source:

Leading goaltenders 
Only the top five goaltenders, based on save percentage, who have played 50% of their team's minutes are included in this list.
Source:

See also
 1995 World Junior Ice Hockey Championships

Citations

References 
 Complete results
 
 

IIHF Men's World Ice Hockey Championships
1995
World
April 1995 sports events in Europe
May 1995 sports events in Europe
Sports competitions in Gävle
1990s in Stockholm
International sports competitions in Stockholm
March 1995 sports events in Europe
1994–95 in Slovak ice hockey
1994–95 in Bulgarian ice hockey
Sports competitions in Sofia
1990s in Sofia
1990s in Johannesburg
International ice hockey competitions hosted by South Africa
International ice hockey competitions hosted by Slovakia
International ice hockey competitions hosted by Bulgaria
1995 in South African ice hockey
Sports competitions in Bratislava
1990s in Bratislava
Sports competitions in Johannesburg